Jijel, the classical Igilgili, is the capital of Jijel Province in north-eastern Algeria. It is flanked by the Mediterranean Sea in the region of Corniche Jijelienne and had a population of 131,513 in 2008.

Jijel is the administrative and trade center for a region specialising in cork processing, leather tanning and steelmaking. Local crops include citrus and grain. Fishing is also of great importance. Tourists (mainly Algerians) are attracted to Jijel for its landscapes and fine sand beaches. Being a resort town, there are many hotels and restaurants. There are Phoenician tombs nearby.

Geography and ecology
Jijel is situated 30 km from Taza National Park; this national park and other vicinity features support a variety of flora and fauna. It is an important habitat for the endangered Barbary macaque, Macaca sylvanus.

History

Igilgili originally Phoenician, the city passed to the Carthaginians, the Roman Republic and Empire, the Vandals, the Byzantines, the Umayyads, the Genovese, and the Ottomans. It was conquered for the last in the 16th century by Hayreddin Barbarossa.

In July 1664, the French took the city. Resistance was organised under the direction of Shaban Aga and the French were driven out in October of the same year. Jijel remained a corsair stronghold until recaptured by the French in 1839. Strong local resistance, finally subdued in 1851, resulted in the construction of three forts along its southern fringe as well as minimal colonisation. The original town was devastated by an earthquake in 1856.

Communications
Due to the rugged landscape, Jijel is slightly isolated. However, it is connected by road to large cities like Bejaïa (90 km west), Setif (135 km southwest) and Constantine (150 km southeast). The city also has its own airport Jijel Ferhat Abbas Airport.

Infrastructure
Jijel is built along modern patterns with wide streets framed by trees. The surroundings consist largely of dense cork-oak forest. A peninsula lies right out from the coast and there is a citadel to the north. There is a hospital, previously a Catholic church (which was demolished), mosques and University of Jijel.

Port
A relatively new port has been built at Djen Djen, approximately 7 miles east of Jijel, which can handle large bulk carriers having a draft up to 18.2m. Presently, the port is mainly used by car carriers and break bulk vessels.

See also

List of lighthouses in Algeria
1856 Djijelli earthquakes
European enclaves in North Africa before 1830

Sources
 C. Michael Hogan. 2008.  Barbary Macaque: Macaca sylvanus, GlobalTwitcher.com, ed. Nicklas Stromberg
 Encyclopædia Britannica. 2002. Edition 15, v. 6  , 
 Enterprise Portuaire de Djen Djen. 2009. Port Authority Website

References

Communes of Jijel Province
Mediterranean port cities and towns in Algeria
Cities in Algeria
Province seats of Algeria
Lighthouses in Algeria